Sergey Kaznacheyev (born 14 December 1974) is a Kazakhstani speed skater. He competed in two events at the 1998 Winter Olympics.

References

1974 births
Living people
Kazakhstani male speed skaters
Olympic speed skaters of Kazakhstan
Speed skaters at the 1998 Winter Olympics
Place of birth missing (living people)